Aristide Garbini (1890–1950) was an Italian film actor.

Selected filmography

 The Crusaders (1918)
 Messalina (1924)
 Miryam (1929)
 Five to Nil (1932)
 Ragazzo (1934)
 The Old Guard (1934)
 Aldebaran (1935)
 King of Diamonds (1936)
 Doctor Antonio (1937)
 The Count of Brechard (1938)
 Heartbeat (1939)
 Hurricane in the Tropics (1939)
 Father For a Night (1939)
 Guest for One Night (1939)
 Two on a Vacation (1940)
 The Sinner (1940)
 Antonio Meucci (1940)
 Red Tavern (1940)
 Red Roses (1940)
 The Prisoner of Santa Cruz (1941)
 After Casanova's Fashion (1942)
 Street of the Five Moons (1942)
 Non ti pago! (1942)
 Four Steps in the Clouds (1942)
 The Last Wagon (1943)
 Mist on the Sea (1944)
 Romulus and the Sabines (1945)
 Unknown Man of San Marino (1946)
 The Opium Den (1947)
 Bullet for Stefano (1947)
 Mad About Opera (1948)
 Yvonne of the Night (1949)
 Ring Around the Clock (1950)

References

Bibliography
 Verdone, Luca. I film di Alessandro Blasetti. Gremese Editore, 1989.

External links

1890 births
1950 deaths
Italian male film actors
Italian male stage actors
Male actors from Rome